Antoine Pierre Marie François Joseph de Lévis-Mirepoix, 5th Duke of San Fernando Luis, GE (1 August 1884 in Léran, Ariège – 16 July 1981, in  Lavelanet) was a French historian, novelist and essayist. He was known as duke of Lévis-Mirepoix (having inherited the dukedom on his father's death on 10 May 1915), also having the titles of fifth Duke of San Fernando Luis, grandee of Spain and 4th baron of de Lévis-Mirepoix. The writer Claude Silve, winner of the Prix Femina in 1935  for her novel Bénédiction was his sister.

Publications
Philippe Auguste et ses trois femmes, Coll. Histoire, XXXIII, Club des Libraires de France,  Paris, 1962, 328 pages

References

 Hubert Cuny and Nicole Dreneau, Le Gotha français : état présent des familles ducales et princières (depuis 1940), L'Intermédiaire des chercheurs et curieux, 1989 
 Comité de Défense du Château de Lagarde "chateau-lagarde.com"

External links 
 Académie française

 

1884 births
1981 deaths
People from Ariège (department)
People affiliated with Action Française
Grandees of Spain
Antoine
Barons of France
Order of the Francisque recipients
French male essayists
French male novelists
20th-century French novelists
20th-century French historians
20th-century French essayists
20th-century French male writers